Walkaway is a small town in the City of Greater Geraldton local government area of Western Australia.

Its name is a corruption of the native "Wagga wah", referring to the bend in the nearby Greenough River, and was originally given to the railway station when a line was built from Geraldton in 1887.

Rail
In 1894 Midland railway line, Western Australia was linked with Midland Junction by the building of a private line–that of the Midland Railway Company, constructed by an engineer and later the first general manager of the company, Edward V. H. Keane. With the railway and an expanding agricultural area, the township grew until with the dieselisation of the railway systems, and the take-over by the State of the Midland Railway in 1964, decline set in. This was also accentuated by the gradual absorption of the original smallholdings into the larger holdings of today's farming demands.

Renewable Energy
A number of renewable energy generation projects are located near Walkaway. Current projects (2014) produce 162 Megawatts of electrical power. Additional projects along with upgrades to current projects are scheduled for construction. The Mid West region is identified as a potential location for developing renewable energy technologies that include additional wind and solar photovoltaic electricity projects, solar thermal, geothermal, bioenergy, and ocean energy.

Walkaway Wind Farm
Development consent has been given for an expansion of the project to up to 400MW.

Mumbida Wind Farm
Mumbida was completed in 2013 and is now fully operational. Mumbida Wind Farm utilises the 2.5 MW General Electric 2.5xl wind turbines, the first time that this model of wind turbine has been used in Australia. The Mumbida wind farm has been designed to be expanded to 85MW in the future.

Greenough River Solar Farm
The Greenough River Solar Farm is the first stage of a 40MW solar photo voltaic (PV) electricity generator. Stage 1 currently produces 10MW and was commissioned in 2012. At the time of commissioning, it was the largest solar PV generator in Australia.

References

Further reading
 Gunzburg, Adrian (1989)  The Midland Railway Company of Western Australia – Locomotives  Melbourne, Vic : Light Railway Research Society of Australia.  (Includes a condensed history of the company from 1886 to 1964)
 Heritage Council of W.A. (1988) Greenough/Walkaway heritage trail : settlement of the Greenough River Flats : a Commonwealth/State Bicentennial Project. Perth, W.A.: Heritage Council of W.A..
 Heritage Council of W.A. (1999) Heritage trail, Greenough/Walkaway : settlement of the Greenough River Flats. East Perth, W.A. : Heritage Council of Western Australia. – Part of the Heritage Trails Network.

 

Towns in Western Australia
Mid West (Western Australia)